The Airwave Wave is an Austrian single-place, paraglider that was designed by Bruce Goldsmith and produced by Airwave Gliders of Fulpmes. It is now out of production.

Design and development
The Wave was designed as a beginner glider, with the three models each named for their relative size.

Variants
Wave S
Small-sized model for lighter pilots. The glider model is DHV 1 certified.
Wave M
Mid-sized model for medium-weight pilots. The glider model is DHV 1 certified.
Wave L
Large-sized model for heavier pilots. The glider model is DHV 1 certified.

Specifications (Wave M)

References

Wave
Paragliders